The Bernard Krone Holding GmbH & Co. KG is a German company; it goes back to the year 1906 when Bernard and Anna Krone founded as a blacksmith's shop. He sold agricultural hardware, ovens and stoves.

In 1924 he bequeathed his business to his son who was also named Bernard.

The holding, still family property, consists of three judicially independent companies:

Fahrzeugwerk (Vehicle Manufactury) Bernard Krone GmbH
Maschinenfabrik (Machine Manufactury) Bernard Krone GmbH
Landtechnik Vertrieb und Dienstleistungen (Agricultural Distribution and Services) Bernard Krone Gmbh

The main works are in Spelle and Werlte, Germany. 
Dr.-Ing. E. h. Bernard Krone, owner and Chairman of the Advisory Board of Bernard Krone Holding GmbH & Co. KG is member of the Presiding Board of the VDA (Verband der Automobilindustrie = German Car Industry Association).

Vehicle Manufactory
Fahrzeugwerk Bernard Krone GmbH builds trailers, semi trailers, swap systems, steel-clad swap bodies  and insulated refrigerated bodies,  carriers and superstructures. 
The company has subsidiaries in four countries.

Machine Manufactory
Maschinenfabrik Bernard Krone GmbH is one of Europe's foremost producers of forage wagons, self-loading forage wagons, disc mowers, rotary tedders, rakes, large square balers, round balers, forage harvesters and high-performance mower conditioners. 
The company is present in many countries including the USA.

Agricultural Distribution and Services
Landtechnik Vertrieb und Dienstleistungen Bernard Krone Gmbh offers a variety of services and also deals with machines and vehicles of other producers.

External Links
  - Group Website
 Krone Landmaschinen
 Krone North America
 Krone Trailer

References

Manufacturing companies established in 1906
Construction equipment manufacturers of Germany
Engineering vehicles
Lawn and garden tractors
Power tool manufacturers
1906 establishments in Germany
Manufacturing companies of Germany